André Gaudette (born December 16, 1947) is a Canadian retired professional ice hockey forward. He played 222 games in the World Hockey Association for the Quebec Nordiques. He is the father of the actor Maxim Gaudette.

External links
 

1947 births
Canadian ice hockey centres
French Quebecers
Ice hockey people from Quebec
Living people
Quebec Aces (AHL) players
Quebec Nordiques (WHA) players
Sportspeople from Sherbrooke